The 2022 Women's Basketball Invitational (WBI) was a single-elimination tournament consisting of eight National Collegiate Athletic Association (NCAA) Division I teams not selected to participate in the 2022 NCAA Division I women's basketball tournament or 2022 Women's National Invitation Tournament. The 2022 field was announced March 13. The 2022 edition of the tournament was played on the campus of Transylvania University in Lexington, Kentucky at the Clive M. Beck Center. This was the second year in a row the tournament format consisted of an eight-team field played over four days, with a guarantee of three games for all teams. There was no winning percentage requirement to compete in the tournament. Saint Mary's beat the defending WBI champions, Cleveland State, in the final.

Bracket

See also
2022 NCAA Division I women's basketball tournament
2022 Women's National Invitation Tournament

References

External links
 Women's Basketball Invitational

Women's Basketball Invitational
Women's Basketball Invitational
Women's Basketball Invitational
Women's Basketball Invitational